Charles Stourton, 19th Baron Stourton (1802–1872) was the son of William Stourton, 18th Baron Stourton and Catherine Weld, daughter of Thomas Weld. He succeeded to the title on his father's death in 1846.

The nineteenth Baron married Mary Lucy Clifford, daughter of Charles Clifford, 6th Baron  Clifford of Chudleigh and  Eleanor Mary Arundell, daughter of Henry  Arundell, 8th Baron  Arundell of Wardour, in 1825. They had the following issue:
William Stourton (1826-1838), died young;
Alfred Joseph, who became 20th Baron Stourton in 1872, 23rd Baron Mowbray in 1878, and 24th Baron Segrave in 1878;
Capt. Everard Stourton (1834-1869), married Hon. Fernina Bellew (daughter of Patrick Bellew, 1st Baron Bellew), had issue;
Albert Stourton (1835-1902), married Elizabeth Throckmorton (daughter of Robert Throckmorton, 8th Baronet Throckmorton), had issue.

Notes

References
 Kidd, Charles and Williamson, David (editors). Debrett's Peerage and Baronetage (1995 edition). London: St. Martin's Press, 1995, 

1872 deaths
19
1802 births
19th-century English people